The Walk may refer to:

Arts, entertainment, and media

Films 
 The Walk (1953 film), a film directed and starring Renato Rascel
 The Walk (1967 film), an Argentinean film
 The Walk (2001 film), an American film
 The Walk (2015 film), a film about Philippe Petit's 1974 tightrope walk at the World Trade Center
 The Walk (2022 film), a period drama film
 The Walk, a 2005 UK production featuring Crispin Bonham-Carter

Music 
 The Walk (album), a 2007 album by Hanson
 The Walk (band), a Canadian alternative rock band
 "The Walk" (Jimmy McCracklin song), 1957
 "The Walk" (Eurythmics song), 1982
 "The Walk" (The Time song), 1982
 "The Walk" (The Cure song), 1983
 "The Walk" (Sawyer Brown song), 1991
 "The Walk", a song by Imogen Heap from Speak for Yourself
 "The Walk", a song by Mayer Hawthorne

Television
 "The Walk" (The X-Files), an episode of the American science fiction television series The X-Files
The Walk, a 250-mile pilgrimage walk (featured in The Path season 1) taken by followers of the fictional Meyerism movement
 The Walk TV, an American television network

Other uses 
 The Walk (Indiana State), an Indiana State Homecoming tradition
 The Walk (Jumeirah Beach Residence), an outlet mall and tourist attraction
 Atlantic City Outlets at The Walk, an outlet mall
 The Living Word Fellowship or "The Walk", a group of nondenominational Christian churches in North and South America
 Little Amal, The Walk, performance art featuring an animatronic puppet which represents a refugee child called Little Amal

See also
 Walk (disambiguation)
 Walking (disambiguation)